You'd Be Surprised! is a 1930 British musical comedy film directed by Walter Forde and starring Forde, Joy Windsor and Frank Stanmore. The film was shot at the Nettlefold Studios in Walton. It was made during the transition to sound film. Originally silent, it had synchronised songs and music added. A silent version was also released to cater to cinemas that hadn't converted to sound yet.

Premise
After dressing up as a prisoner for a fancy dress party, a songwriter is mistaken for a notorious escaped convict.

Cast
Walter Forde as Walter 
Joy Windsor as Maisie Vane 
Frank Stanmore as Frankie 
Frank Perfitt as Major 
Douglas Payne as Convict 99

Critical reception
Allmovie described it as a "bouncy musical...At one point, the star ventures into Harold Lloyd territory when he finds himself manacled to a huge and surly thug who drags our poor hero all over London. Much of the film suffers from substandard sound recording, though a few innovative audio effects emerge from the cacophony."

References

Bibliography
Low, Rachael. Filmmaking in 1930s Britain. George Allen & Unwin, 1985.
Wood, Linda. British Films, 1927-1939. British Film Institute, 1986.

External links

1930 films
British silent feature films
Transitional sound comedy films
British musical comedy films
British black-and-white films
1930 musical comedy films
1930s English-language films
Films directed by Walter Forde
Films shot at Nettlefold Studios
Films set in England
Butcher's Film Service films
1930s British films
Silent comedy films